Bled agreement may refer to:

 Bled agreement (1938), the agreement between Hungary and the Little Entente
 Bled agreement (1947), the agreement between Yugoslavia and Bulgaria